
Gmina Koło is a rural gmina (administrative district) in Koło County, Greater Poland Voivodeship, in west-central Poland. Its seat is the town of Koło, although the town is not part of the territory of the gmina.

Villages
Gmina Koło contains the villages and settlements of Aleksandrówka, Borki, Chojny, Czołowo, Czołowo-Kolonia, Dąbrowa, Dzierawy, Kaczyniec, Kamień, Kiełczew Górny, Kiełczew Smużny Czwarty, Kiełczew Smużny Pierwszy, Leśnica, Lubiny, Lucjanowo, Mikołajówek, Ochle, Podlesie, Powiercie, Powiercie-Kolonia, Przybyłów, Ruchenna, Skobielice, Sokołowo, Stellutyszki, Wandynów, Wrząca Wielka and Zawadka.

Neighbouring gminas
Gmina Koło is bordered by the town of Koło and by the gminas of Babiak, Dąbie, Grzegorzew, Kościelec, Kramsk and Osiek Mały.

References
Polish official population figures 2006

Kolo
Koło County